John Law is a British jazz pianist and composer, born in London to British and Austrian parents.

Biography
He started classical piano at the age of four, playing in public at the age of six. With early encouragement from the Austrian concert pianist Alfred Brendel he was awarded a scholarship to study piano and composition at the Royal Academy of Music where he studied from 1979–1983, winning prizes for piano playing. After being awarded an Austrian government scholarship to study with the Viennese pianist Paul Badura-Skoda he studied for a year in Vienna at the Hochschule für Musik und darstellende Kunst, Wien. It was in Vienna that he first came across jazz and decided to pursue a career in this field, hoping to combine his love of the piano and performing with his interest in composition.

After some initial studies with Simon Purcell his early interest lay in freely improvised music. He performed with Evan Parker, Louis Moholo and Barry Guy, among others. In 1990 he began a long-term musical relationship with the saxophonist and composer Jon Lloyd, recording with Lloyd's quartet his first CD, Syzygy, for the Leo Records label. More recently Law appeared on Jon Lloyd's Vanishing Points (2013). Later John Law was to turn back to an exploration of his classical roots with a four-CD solo piano set entitled Chants, which was a series of compositions/improvisations based on early music and plainchant. Later still John turned towards a more recognisably contemporary jazz area, working with Tim Garland, Tim Wells, Dave Wickins, Steve Watts, Martin Speake, Paul Clarvis, Julian Siegel, Julian Nicholas and others, though his work has continued to include references to classical music, freely improvised music and the avant garde.

After 2005 Law was most widely known for his project The Art of Sound. The name of the trio, as well as the resulting series of four CDs, was taken from the name of the Italian studio where the recordings were all made: Artesuono in Udine, Italy. Playing almost exclusively Law's original, sometimes complex, sometimes extremely melodic, compositions, the trio, with Asaf Sirkis on drums and Sam Burgess on bass, recorded two highly successful albums: The Art of Sound, Volume 1 and Congregation, The Art of Sound Volume 4.  Of The Art of Sound Vol 1, John Fordham in The Guardian wrote "As well as being a formidable thematic improviser, whose phrasing constantly opens up new twists, Law writes beautiful romantic ballads" and awarded 4 stars. Volumes 2 and 3 were both solo piano recordings. Later, the Russian bass virtuoso Yuri Goloubev came into the trio and it changed to John Law's Congregation. Known for incorporating subtle effects into the piano and bass sound and for the addition to the drum kit of glockenspiel, hang and other sounds, the trio became known as much for the wide palette of sound colours, within a conventional jazz piano trio, as for the instrumental virtuosity of the individual players and the intricate, intense atmosphere of Law's compositions.  In All About Jazz Jakob Baekgaard wrote "Three Leaps of the Gazelle finds Law and his cohorts at the top of their game. It would be hard to find a more innovative and sympathetic trio working in jazz today." He awarded 5 stars. The same reviewer awarded 5 stars for John Law/Mark Pringle This Is.   Jazzwise wrote "[Law, a] pianist with an international reputation, unleashes an unstoppable flow of ideas with whatever band he puts together, constantly trying new things."

Law also performs solo piano concerts. During 2002/3 he performed in a two piano project with the UK pianist Jason Rebello.

In 2001 Law's recording Abacus, featuring the American drummer Gerry Hemingway was awarded a prize, a Choc, as one of the best CDs of the year, by the French jazz magazine Jazzman. In 2005 Law was awarded a distinction at classical piano diploma level, gaining dipABRSM.

Law has also composed for, toured and recorded a large suite for large ensemble, Out of the Darkness, with Andy Sheppard and members of the London Sinfonietta.  At the Purcell Room in London, John Fordham described Out of the Darkness as "an ambitious piece combining rich and slowly transforming (sometimes rather Mike Gibbs-like) harmonic movements, sudden clustered ensemble sprints, and systems-music overlays of phrasing deploying bassoon, brass and strings lines against the jazz instruments... A rich and completely distinctive contemporary music programme."

John Law has also performed classical music projects, mainly the solo piano and visuals Goldberg, where he played J.S.Bach's Goldberg Variations (on the modern grand piano) with live accompanying visuals by graphic artist David Daniels, adapted live to the music by Patrick Dunn; also his two piano project Sacre, with fellow pianist David Gordon, where they played a selection of Stravinsky's Rite of Spring with original jazz re-interpretations of some of the key movements interpolated in-between the Stravinsky.

His current three main projects are his original quartet Congregation, featuring James Mainwaring on saxophones, guitar and effects, his quartet Re-Creations, which plays creative arrangements of well known tunes by other people, and Renaissance, an ambient duo with saxophonist Jon Lloyd, with John Law on midi keyboards and laptop, playing improvised music over looped pads derived from early sacred vocal music, put together by Jasper Law, with live visuals by Patrick Dunn.

He has performed at over 50 festivals worldwide and made over 40 recordings. In 2020 he was awarded a prestigious Paul Hamlyn Foundation Award for Artists.

Selected discography
 Syzygy (Jon Lloyd Quartet, 1992),
 Exploded on Impact (John Law Quartet, 1993)
 Head (Jon Lloyd Quartet, 1993)
 Talitha Cumi (John Law solo piano, 1994)
 The Boat is Sinking, Apartheid is Sinking (John Law, Louis Moholo Duo, 1994)
 Pentecost (John Law solo piano, 1996)
 The Onliest (John Law Trio, 1996)
 Giant Leaves (John Law Trio, 1996)
 By Confusion (Jon Lloyd Quartet, 1997)
 The Hours (John Law solo piano, 1997)
 Songs Without Words (John Law Trio 1998)
 Strange Stories (John Law Trio, 2000)
 Thanatos (John Law solo piano, 2000)
 Abacus (John Law Quartet featuring Jon Lloyd, Gerry Hemingway, 2001)
 The Moment (John Law Trio/Quartet featuring Tim Garland, 2001)
 Monk 'n' Junk (John Law Trio/Quartet featuring Julian Siegel, 2002)
 Out of the Darkness (Cornucopia Ensemble featuring Andy Sheppard, 2004)
 Mimesis (Jon Lloyd/John Law Duo, 2006)
 The Art of Sound Volume 1 (John Law/Sam Burgess/Asaf Sirkis, 2007)
 The Ghost in the Oak, The Art of Sound Volume 2 (John Law solo piano, 2008)
 Chorale, The Art of Sound Volume 3 (John Law solo piano, 2008)
 Congregation, The Art of Sound Volume 4 (John Law/Sam Burgess/Asaf Sirkis, 2009)
 The Journey Home (Nick Sorensen/John Law Duo, 2010)
 This Is (John Law, Mark Pringle duo, 2011)
 Three Leaps of the Gazelle (John Law/Yuri Goloubev/Asaf Sirkis, 2012)
 Vanishing Points (Jon Lloyd Group, 2013)
 Boink! (John Law featuring Jon Lloyd, Rob Palmer and Laurie Lowe, 2014)
 These Skies In Which We Rust (John Law's New Congregation featuring Josh Arcoleo, Yuri Goloubev and Laurie Lowe, 2014)
 Goldberg (John Law, 2014)
 Re-Creations Volume 1 (John Law Quartet featuring Sam Crockatt, James Agg, Billy Weir, 2017)
 Re-Creations Volume 2 (John Law solo piano, 2019)
 Re-Creations Volume 3 (John Law Quartet featuring Sam Crockatt, James Agg, Billy Weir, 2019)
 CONFIGURATION (John Law's Congregation, featuring James Mainwaring, Ashley John Long, Billy Weir, 2020)
 Renaissance - Live at Malmesbury Abbey (John Law/Jon Lloyd/Jasper Law, 2022)

References

Sources
 Cadence interview by Ludwig van Trikt
 Baekgaard, Jakob. All About Jazz

External links
 John Law official website

Living people
British jazz pianists
British jazz composers
Avant-garde jazz musicians
Alumni of the Royal Academy of Music
21st-century pianists
Year of birth missing (living people)
FMR Records artists
Leo Records artists